Kerasia is a settlement in Mount Athos. It is located at an elevation of 581 metres on the southwestern slopes of the main peak of Mount Athos. Located just to the east of Little St. Anne's Skete and Katounakia, it is inhabited by a few dozen monks.

List of cells
Some cells in Kerasia include:

Isodia Theotokou
Ag. Georgios
Ag. Ioannis Theologos
Ag. Pantes
Ag. Nikolaos
Timios Prodromos
Ag. Apostoli
Ag. Dimitrios
Panagia

The cell of Agios Antonios (Ιερόν Κελλίον Αγίου Αντωνίου), located in an area called Paleopyrgos (Παλαιόπυργος) just to the east of Kerasia, can be reached from a footpath that leads from main the Kafsokalyvia–Kerasia footpath.

The peak of Karmilio Oros (Καρμήλιο Όρος; "Mount Carmel"; elevation: 887 m) lies just southwest of Kerasia. It is directly to the northeast of the Hermitage of Saint Basil. The Holy Chapel of the Holy Glorious Prophet Elijah (Ιερόν Παρεκκλήσιον Αγίου ενδόξου Προφήτου Ηλιού) and some radio towers sit on top of the peak.

Notable people
Notable people who have lived at Kerasia include Elder Hadji-Georgis the Athonite.

References

Populated places in Mount Athos
Great Lavra